Rachael  Wambui Shebesh is a Kenyan politician. She was the first Nairobi county woman representative, from 2013 to 2017. On 30 October 2021, The CAS, who is married to Frank Shebesh held a colourful traditional wedding ceremony at her parents' home in Githunguri where she marked her completion of marriage rites.

Early  life  and education 
Shebesh was born on 1 July 1971. She attended her primary at Lavingtone primary school from 1977 to 1985. She furthered her education at Kianda school in 1991 to 1993, and in the year 2007 she enrolled for a bachelor of arts in political science at the University of Nairobi.

Career 
Shebesh was appointed in 2007 as the UN champion for risk reduction in Africa. She currently oversees the administration in the ministry of public service, youth and gender affairs. She is committed for the Kenyan Disability Network and also play roles of an adviser to UNIFEM. Before she engaged in politics, Shebesh served as an administrator at Marion schools and ran a fashion and design company.

See also 
Esther Passaris

References 

Members of the 11th Parliament of Kenya
Kenyan women representatives
Year of birth missing (living people)
Living people
21st-century Kenyan women politicians
21st-century Kenyan politicians